Vad man gör (och inte gör) is a 1997 studio album by Idde Schultz.

Track listing
Lyrics and music by Idde Schultz except where noted

Hunger
Riktigt på riktigt
Faller (J. Pihlgren, L. Lövgren)
Innan mitt hjärta fick sin form (Staffan Hellstrand)
Syner
Kan bara vara jag
Någonting någon annanstans
Bara när jag blundar
Vattenfärger
Vad man gör (och inte gör)
Vi kan vara överallt
Förvånad

Contributors
Idde Schultz – vocals, mellotron
Fredrik Blank – guitar
Håkan Bacchus – bass
Nino Keller – drums
with others

Charts

References 

1997 albums
Idde Schultz albums